Shahran Tower  (Borj-e Shahrān) is the tallest residential tower in Iranian Azerbaijan. It is located in Tabriz, Iran.

See also
List of tallest buildings in Iran

Notes

References
 
 Photos Shahran Tower

Buildings and structures in Tabriz
Skyscrapers in Iran
Residential buildings completed in 2013
Residential skyscrapers